XHLPS-FM (102.5 FM) is a radio station in San Luis Río Colorado, Sonora, with a transmitter  away at Colonia Ladrillera, in Mexicali Municipality, Baja California. The station is owned by OIR, a company owned by members of the Aguirre family but separate from Grupo Radio Centro, and is known as Fuerza Latina.

History
The station's concession was awarded on October 21, 1994. XHLPS was originally owned by Humberto Aréchiga Espinoza, from a family with prolific broadcasting interests in Baja California Sur, and operated by Radio Grupo OIR, the dominant broadcaster in San Luis. By the late 2000s, it was known as Radio Río Digital.

In 2003, XHLPS was cleared to put in place its modern technical facilities.

In 2011, XHLPS was sold to its current concessionaire, a Radiorama subsidiary.

References

Radio stations in Sonora
Radio stations in Mexicali
Radio stations established in 1994
San Luis Río Colorado Municipality, Sonora